In the Soop: Friendcation is a South Korean reality show created by Hybe Corporation. A spin-off of the In the Soop series that originally featured BTS and then Seventeen, it stars Peakboy, Park Seo-joon, Choi Woo-shik, Park Hyung-sik, and V of BTS. Comprising four episodes, the show follows the fivesome as they embark on a four-day vacation trip together. It premiered on July 22, 2022, on the South Korean pay television network JTBC and global over-the-top streaming platform Disney+. Episodes aired first on JTBC, at 9PM KST, and were made available two hours later on Disney+. The final episode aired on August 12.

Premise 
The show depicts the travel story of actors Park Seo-joon, Choi Woo-shik and Park Hyung-sik, rapper Peakboy, and singer V of BTS, a group of five friends known as the "Wooga Squad" in the entertainment industry. After one of them makes a surprise suggestion, they set out on a friendship trip lasting four days and three nights. The series documents their candid daily life while they are together.

Episodes

Reception 
In the Soop: Friendcation ranked first in Disney+ Korea's 'Top 10 Overall' and 'Top 10 TV Shows' as well as 'Top Ranked TV Shows' for 10 consecutive days. The series was among the top three most-watched releases in Asia, additionally ranking at number one in Indonesia and Singapore. Following the broadcast of its first episode in Japan, the series claimed first place in all genre rankings on Disney+ and consistently topped the TV show category, ranking first for 25 consecutive days as of August 18, 2022. In an interview with Deadline Hollywood in January 2023, Carol Choi, the managing director of Disney+ Japan and executive vice president of Original Content Strategy for the Asia Pacific region, revealed that the series had "become one of the most popular shows" on the platform.

Ratings 
The series aired on cable channel/pay TV network JTBC, which normally has a relatively smaller audience compared to free-to-air TV/public broadcasters such as KBS, SBS, MBC, and EBS.

References 

South Korean reality television series